Gorillas in the Mist is a 1988 American drama film directed by Michael Apted and starring Sigourney Weaver as the naturalist Dian Fossey. It tells the story of her work in Rwanda with mountain gorillas and was nominated for five Academy Awards.

Plot
Occupational therapist Dian Fossey is inspired by anthropologist Louis Leakey to devote her life to the study of primates. She writes ceaselessly to Leakey for a job cataloging and studying the rare mountain gorillas of Africa. Following him to a lecture in Louisville, Kentucky in 1966, she convinces him of her conviction.

They travel to the Congo, where Leakey and his foundation equip her to make contact with the gorillas, and introduce her to a local animal tracker, Sembagare. Settling deep in the jungle, Fossey and Sembagare locate a troop of gorillas, but are displaced by the events of the Congo Crisis and forcibly evicted from their research site by Congolese soldiers, who accuse Fossey of being a foreign spy and agitator.

Fossey is resigned to returning to the United States, but Sembagare and her temporary host Rosamond Carr motivate her to stay in Africa. Fossey establishes new research efforts in the jungles of neighboring Rwanda, where rampant poaching and corruption become apparent when she discovers several traps near her new base at Karisoke. Nevertheless, Fossey and her colleagues make headway with the gorillas, taking account of their communication and social groups. Her work impresses Leakey and gains international attention.

National Geographic, which funds her efforts, dispatches photographer Bob Campbell to highlight her research. Fossey, initially unreceptive, grows increasingly attached to Campbell after several photo sessions with the gorillas, and the two become lovers, in spite of Campbell's marriage. Campbell proposes to divorce his wife and marry Fossey but insists that she would have to spend time away from Karisoke and her gorillas, leading her to end their relationship. Fossey forms an emotional bond with a gorilla named Digit, and attempts to prevent the export of other gorillas by trader Van Vecten.

Appalled by the poaching of the gorillas for their skins, hands, and heads, Fossey complains to the Rwandan government and is dismissed, but a government minister (Waigwa Wachira) promises to hire an anti-poaching squad. Fossey's frustrations reach a climax when Digit is beheaded by poachers. She leads numerous anti-poaching patrols, burns down the poachers' villages, and even stages a mock execution of one of the offenders, serving to alienate some of her research assistants and gaining her various enemies. Sembagare expresses concern at Fossey’s opposition to the emergent industry of gorilla tourism, but she nonchalantly dismisses his worries.

On December 27, 1985, Dian Fossey is murdered in the bedroom of her cabin by an unseen assailant. At a funeral attended by Sembagare, Carr, and others, she is buried in the same cemetery where Digit and other gorillas had been laid to rest. Sembagare symbolically links the graves of Fossey and Digit with stones as a sign that their souls rest in peace together before leaving.

The epilogue text explains that Fossey’s actions helped save the gorillas from extinction, while her death remains a mystery.

Cast

 Sigourney Weaver as Dian Fossey
 Bryan Brown as Bob Campbell
 Julie Harris as Roz Carr
 John Omirah Miluwi as Sembagare
 Iain Cuthbertson as Dr. Louis Leakey
 Constantin Alexandrov as Van Vecten
 Waigwa Wachira as Mukara
 Iain Glen as Brendan
 David Lansbury as Larry
 Maggie O'Neill as Kim
 Konga Mbandu as Rushemba
 Michael J. Reynolds as Howard Dowd
 Gordon Masten as the Photographer
 Peter Nduati as Batwa chief
 Helen Fraser as Mme. Van Vecten
 John Alexander as Mime Artist
 Peter Elliott as Mime Artist
 Denise Cheshire as Mime Artist
 Antonio Hoyos as Mime Artist
 Jody St. Michael as Mime Artist
 David Maddock as himself

Production
The screenplay was adapted by Anna Hamilton Phelan from articles by Alex Shoumatoff and Harold T. P. Hayes and a story by Phelan and Tab Murphy. The original music score was composed by Maurice Jarre. The movie was directed by Michael Apted and the cinematography was by John Seale.

Soundtrack
 Peggy Lee – "September in the Rain" (written by Harry Warren & Al Dubin)
 Peggy Lee – "It's a Good Day" (written by Peggy Lee & Dave Barbour)
 Peggy Lee – "Sugar" (written by Maceo Pinkard & Sidney D. Mitchell & Edna Alexander)

Release

Critical reception
The film received generally positive reviews from critics, with many praising both Weaver's performance and the technical accomplishments of the movie while some were frustrated by the lack of depth in Fossey's on-screen characterization.

"At last, [Weaver] may have found a part cut to her scale." wrote Hal Hinson of The Washington Post. "It's a great role for her to pour herself into, and she doesn't skimp." However, he had his misgivings about the restrictions placed on Fossey's character: "The chief problem with Gorillas in the Mist is that it banalizes its heroine; it turns her into one of us. And by all accounts Fossey was anything but ordinary." He also accused the filmmakers of toning down Fossey's unstable mental state: "Fossey was more than merely eccentric...The movie hints at these aspects of her character but tries to soften them;...the filmmakers have done more than sanitize Fossey's life, they've deprived it of any meaning." Hinson concluded that "Gorillas in the Mist isn't a terrible film, but it is a frustrating one."

While Roger Ebert was also happy with the casting of Weaver as Fossey ("It is impossible to imagine a more appropriate choice for the role"), he felt the character was too distanced from the audience and that her development and motives were unclear. "Gorillas in the Mist tells us what Dian Fossey accomplished and what happened to her, but it doesn't tell us who she was, and at the end that's what we want to know." However, Ebert was impressed by the scenes with the gorillas and the way live footage of gorillas was seamlessly blended with gorilla costumes: "Everything looked equally real to me, and the delicacy with which director Michael Apted developed the relationships between woman and beast was deeply absorbing. There were moments when I felt a touch of awe. Those moments, which are genuine, make the movie worth seeing."

Hinson also agreed that "whenever the cameras turn on the gorillas — who are the film's true stars — you feel you're witnessing something truly great."

The film holds an 85% fresh rating at Rotten Tomatoes based on 20 critics' reviews, with an average review of 6.8/10.

Box-office
Gorillas in the Mist started an exclusive run on 15 screens on September 23, 1988 and grossed $366,925. It expanded to 558 screens the following weekend and was the number one film for the weekend with a gross of $3,451,230. The film went on to gross $24,720,479 in the United States and Canada and $36,429,000 internationally for a worldwide total of $61,149,479.

Accolades

The film is recognized by American Film Institute in these lists:
 2003: AFI's 100 Years...100 Heroes & Villains:
 Dian Fossey – Nominated Hero
 2006: AFI's 100 Years...100 Cheers – Nominated

Notes

References

External links

 
 
 
 

1988 films
1980s adventure drama films
1980s biographical drama films
American adventure drama films
American biographical drama films
Biographical films about scientists
Environmental films
Films about animal rights
Films directed by Michael Apted
Films featuring a Best Drama Actress Golden Globe-winning performance
Films set in Africa
Films about gorillas
Films set in Rwanda
Films shot in the Democratic Republic of the Congo
Universal Pictures films
Warner Bros. films
Films scored by Maurice Jarre
Films shot in Kenya
Films shot in England
Films shot in Rwanda
Films shot in Toronto
Films set in 1966
Films set in 1985
Films with screenplays by Tab Murphy
1988 drama films
1980s English-language films
1980s American films